Benson Chukwunweike is the Anglican Bishop of Awgu/Aninri of the Church of Nigeria in the Province of Enugu.

He was elected as Bishop of Awgu/Aninri in Jan 2020.

Notes

Living people
Anglican bishops of Awgu/Aninri
21st-century Anglican bishops in Nigeria
Year of birth missing (living people)